Agni Muhurtham is a 1987 Indian Malayalam film, directed and produced by Soman. The film stars Urvashi, Ratheesh, Santhosh and Mala Aravindan in the lead roles. The film has musical score by S. P. Venkatesh.

Cast
Urvashi as Suma
Ratheesh as Vinayan
Santhosh as Subair
Mala Aravindan as Balan
Soorya

Soundtrack
The music was composed by S. P. Venkatesh and the lyrics were written by Balu Kiriyath.

References

External links
 

1987 films
1980s Malayalam-language films